Bryan Johnstone Hodge (born 23 September 1987) is a Scottish footballer who plays for Arbroath.

Hodge is a versatile midfielder who has represented Scotland at under-17, under-18, under-19 and under-20 levels. He started his career at Blackburn Rovers and in his time there had loan spells at Mansfield Town, Millwall and Darlington. He then returned to Scotland, signing for Partick Thistle, and from there moved to Brechin City and then Stenhousemuir. Hodge signed a pre-contract agreement to sign for Forfar Athletic in the summer of 2015, where he stayed for one season before moving to Stirling Albion. Hodge spent just 6 months with Albion, signing for Arbroath in January 2017.

Career
Born in Hamilton, Hodge began his professional footballing career as a trainee with Blackburn Rovers in August 2006. He was loaned to Mansfield Town in late February 2007 in order to gain first-team experience, and made nine appearances before returning to Blackburn in April 2007. He joined Millwall on loan in November 2007, for whom he made 13 league and cup appearances in a two-month spell. He signed a new contract with Blackburn before joining Darlington on loan in February 2008. Hodge made his Blackburn Rovers debut as an 83rd minute substitution for Matt Derbyshire in the FA Cup against Blyth Spartans in January 2009.

On 4 July 2009, Hodge signed a two-year contract with Partick Thistle. In August 2011, Hodge appeared as an unused substitute on the bench, as a trialist, for Greenock Morton in two league games. However, after not being offered a contract at Cappielow, Hodge signed with Second Division side Brechin City.

On 8 June 2012, Hodge signed for Scottish Second Division side Stenhousemuir. At the end of the 2014–15 season, Hodge left The Warriors, after signing a pre-contract agreement with Forfar Athletic, joining the Station Park side at the end of the 2014–15 season.

After one year with Forfar, which saw the side relegated to Scottish League Two, Hodge signed for fellow League Two club Stirling Albion in May 2016. Hodge left Stirling Albion after 6 months with the side, signing for Arbroath on 1 January 2017.

Representative honours
Hodge has represented Scotland at under-17, under-18, under-19 and under-20 levels.

Honours
Arbroath
 Scottish League Two : 2016–17

References

External links

1987 births
Living people
Association football midfielders
Scottish footballers
Blackburn Rovers F.C. players
Mansfield Town F.C. players
Millwall F.C. players
Darlington F.C. players
English Football League players
Partick Thistle F.C. players
Greenock Morton F.C. players
Brechin City F.C. players
Stenhousemuir F.C. players
Forfar Athletic F.C. players
Stirling Albion F.C. players
Arbroath F.C. players
Scottish Football League players
Scottish Professional Football League players
Footballers from Hamilton, South Lanarkshire